1977 Emmy Awards may refer to:

 29th Primetime Emmy Awards, the 1977 Emmy Awards ceremony honoring primetime programming
 4th Daytime Emmy Awards, the 1977 Emmy Awards ceremony honoring daytime programming
 5th International Emmy Awards, the 1977 Emmy Awards ceremony honoring international programming

 
Emmy Award ceremonies by year